Hovdeskar Gap is a gap  just east of Mount Skarshovden at the head of Skarsbrotet Glacier, in the Humboldt Mountains of Queen Maud Land, Antarctica. It was discovered and photographed by the Third German Antarctic Expedition, 1938–39, was mapped by Norway from air photos and surveys by the Sixth Norwegian Antarctic Expedition, 1956–60, and named Hovdeskar (knoll gap).

References

Mountain passes of Queen Maud Land
Humboldt Mountains (Antarctica)